Historically, puerperal fever was a devastating disease. It affected women within the first three days after childbirth and progressed rapidly, causing acute symptoms of severe abdominal pain, fever and debility.

The most common infection causing puerperal fever is genital tract sepsis caused by contaminated medical equipment or unhygienic medical staff who contaminate the mother's genital tract during the delivery. Other types of infection that can lead to sepsis after childbirth include urinary tract infection, breast infection (mastitis) and respiratory tract infection (more common after anaesthesia due to lesions in the trachea). Puerperal fever is now rare in the West due to improved hygiene during delivery, and the few infections that do occur are usually treatable with antibiotics.

The work of Dr. Ignaz Semmelweis 

Dr. Ignaz Semmelweis worked at the Vienna General Hospital's maternity clinic on a 3-year contract from 1846–1849.  There, as elsewhere in European and North American hospitals, puerperal fever, or childbed fever, was rampant, sometimes climbing to 40 percent of admitted patients.  He was disturbed by these mortality rates, and eventually developed a theory of infection, in which he theorized that decaying matter on the hands of doctors, who had recently conducted autopsies, was brought into contact with the genitals of birthgiving women during the medical examinations at the maternity clinic.  He proposed a radical hand washing theory using chlorinated lime, now a known disinfectant.

At the time however, the germ theory of infection had not been developed and Semmelweis' ideas ran contrary to key medical beliefs and practices.  His ideas were rejected and ridiculed. Quite unusually, his contract was not renewed, effectively expelling him from the medical community in Vienna.  He died as an outcast in a mental institution.

Puerperal fever – a modern disease 
An 1841 account of epidemic childbed fever states that insofar as existing historical documents permit one to judge, childbed fever is a modern disease. The cases reported by Hippocrates that are generally identified as such are not puerperal fever. There are only examples of bilious fever, then common, which among maternity patients was no different from its appearance among non-maternity patients or men; Hippocrates himself never identified it as a separate and distinguishable disease.

Hospital Hôtel-Dieu de Paris 

We encounter the first, as yet unclear indication of childbed fever in the second half of the 17th century at the Hôtel-Dieu in Paris. Phillipe Peu relates that mortality among the newly delivered was very great and greater in certain seasons than others. The year 1664 was particularly devastating.

Another account states that the lower abdominal infection, la fièvre puerpérale, had raged every winter since 1774 among the maternity patients of the Hôtel-Dieu, and that often as many as 7 of every 12 patients suffered from it.

The maternity clinic at Würzburg
For the relatively small maternity clinic at Würzburg in Germany, Franz Kiwisch von Rotterau reported 27 deaths from 102 patients (26.5%) cared for during one year, much higher than the Viennese hospital. Semmelweis explained this from the need in small hospitals to use every patient as teaching material. In contrast, "in Vienna there is such an excess of teaching material that hundreds of individuals are not used for teaching and thus are not infected".

Inconsistencies in data
There are various inconsistencies in the datasets reported by Semmelweis and provided below.  Inconsistencies exist for instance in reported yearly rates, and monthly rates (if aggregated to yearly basis).  One of the causes may be that Semmelweis used different sources.  He points out several times that actual mortality rates were higher than reported ones, because during childbed fever epidemics, the maternity ward was overwhelmed with dying women, who were then transferred to the general hospital, and therefore not registered at the maternity ward, when dying. Some women were also released from the maternity ward, either healthy or not so healthy, only to be readmitted to the general hospital when symptoms appeared or worsened.  See also a similar underreporting practice at the Charité in Berlin, Joseph Hermann Schmidt.

There were two maternity clinics at the Vienna General Hospital.  Semmelweis is not always specific, if the numbers are for both clinics, or for his own clinic only.  The figures presented below are exactly as reported in (the 1983 translation by Carter of) Semmelweis' 1861 publication.

There are also at times minor arithmetical errors in his computed rates; for this reason all rates on this page are computed.

Mortality rates at the Vienna General Hospital

Monthly mortality rates for birthgiving women 1841–49 
 

The table below shows monthly incidence rates from 1841–1849, Semmelweis' handwashing policy was implemented from June 1847 to February 1849.

Explanatory power of his theory of cadaverous poisoning
From his theory of decaying matter on the hands of examining physicians as a cause for childbed fever he was able to explain other features in the dataset, for instance why mortality rates were remarkably higher during winter than summer, because of increased student activity and scheduled autopsies immediately before the rounds at the maternity clinic.  He writes:

The prevailing opinion is that winter is the season most conducive to outbreaks of childbed fever. This is explained by the different activities of those who visit the maternity hospital. These activities are determined by the season. After the long vacation in August and September, students resume their studies, including obstetrics, with renewed diligence. In winter the influx of students into the maternity hospital is so great that individuals must wait weeks and even months for their turn to study. In summer, during vacation, half or even two-thirds of the places are vacant.  In winter, the pathological and forensic autopsies and the medical and surgical wards are visited industriously by those who also visit the maternity hospital. In summer, the diligence is noticeably less. The charming surroundings of Vienna are more attractive than the reeking morgue or the sultry wards of the hospital.

In winter the assistant of obstetrics holds practical operative exercises on cadavers before the afternoon rounds at the maternity ward at four o'clock, because in the mornings students are otherwise engaged, and following the afternoon rounds, at five o'clock, it is already too dark. In summer the heat is too oppressive before the afternoon visit, and the operative exercises are held in the evening following afternoon rounds.

He was able to explain additional features:

The assistant of the first clinic seldom visited the morgue in the months of December 1846 and January, February, and March 1847. The students followed his example. The opportunity for them to contaminate their hands with cadaverous particles was thereby greatly reduced. Restricting examinations to the minimum also reduced the opportunity for the genitals of patients to be touched by contaminated hands. For these reasons, mortality in the first clinic was reduced during these months.

I had Carl von Rokitansky's permission to dissect all female corpses, including those not already set aside for autopsy, in order to correlate the results of my examinations with autopsies. I devoted nearly every morning before the professor's rounds in the obstetrical clinic to these studies. On 20 March 1847, I reassumed the position of assistant in the first clinic. Early that morning I conducted my gynecological studies in the morgue. I then went to the labor room and began to examine all the patients, as my predecessors and I were obliged to do, so that I could report on each patient during the professor's morning rounds. My hands, contaminated by cadaverous particles, were thereby brought into contact with the genitals of so many women in labor that in April, from 312 deliveries, there were 57 deaths (18.3 percent). Only God knows the number of patients who went prematurely to their graves because of me. I have examined corpses to an extent equaled by few other obstetricians.

He was also able to explain why women with extended dilation invariably died: "Infection occurs most often during dilation. [...] ..it is frequently necessary to penetrate the uterus in manual examination to determine the location and position of the fetus. Thus, before chlorine washings, almost every patient whose period dilation was extended died of childbed fever."

Yearly mortality rates for birthgiving women 1833–58 for first and second clinics 

A second clinic was started in 1833 because of the large number of women being admitted to the maternity ward.  Medical students and midwife students undertook their studies at both clinics. In 1841 however, these two groups were separated.  Thereafter, medical students attended the first clinic only, and midwife students attended the second clinic only. Joseph Späth was professor at the second clinic.

Yearly mortality rates for birthgiving women 1784–1849 

Semmelweis seeks to demonstrate that the advent of pathological anatomy, and consequently the increase in autopsies, is correlated to the incidence of childbed fever. From 1789–1822 professor Johann Lucas Boër was assigned the teaching post at the maternity ward, however he left the post discouraged of what was then regarded as an enormous mortality rate.  He was succeeded by professor Johann Klein who reformed obstetrics to an anatomical orientation emphasizing the value of pathological autopsies.  Mortality rates jump markedly.

Yearly mortality rates for newborn infants 1841–46 for first and second clinics
The mortality rate for newborn infants was also higher in the first clinic.

Yearly patient mortality rates at the Dublin Maternity Hospital 1784–1849

Semmelweis compared mortality rates in Vienna with maternity institutions in the United Kingdom where mortality rates were lower. He wished to show that childbed fever was related to pathological anatomy. His choice, Dublin Maternity Hospital, was like the Viennese hospital, a large teaching institution for physicians.

He argued that, as a rule, German and French maternity hospitals are associated with large general hospitals. Therefore, their students occupy themselves in morgues, and in medical and surgical wards, as well as in maternity wards. In this way they become carriers of the decaying matter responsible for childbed fever.

Contrary hereto, maternity hospitals in the United Kingdom were independent institutions; removed from general hospitals. The students are forced to concern themselves exclusively with obstetrics, they do not carry out pathological autopsies.

Contamination of midwives' hands
The second obstetrical clinic at Vienna General Hospital that instructed midwife students evidently had a lower mortality rate than the first obstetrical clinic, where physicians were instructed.

While the midwife students in Vienna were not partaking in autopsies, there were still opportunities for them to contaminate their hands. In a lecture in 1846 Jakob Kolletschka is reputed to have said, "It is here no uncommon thing for midwives, especially in the commencement of their practice, to pull off legs and arms of infants, and even to pull away the entire body and leave the head in the uterus. Such occurrences are not altogether uncommon; they often happen."

The Maternité in Paris was an exception. It was exclusively for the education of midwives, but it had a mortality rate as great as Paul-Antoine Dubois's Paris Clinic for the education of physicians. In the Maternité, midwives participated in autopsies as frequently physicians would elsewhere.

The hospital midwives and some of their students accompanied the physician on his daily rounds through the infirmary for maternity patients. Each student was assigned a diseased patient for particular observation and was expected to prepare a short case history of the birth and of the physician's treatment.  Autopsies were conducted in a building in the garden somewhat removed from the maternity hospital; these were usually attended by student midwives. I was often astonished to see the active part some of the young women took in the dissection of corpses. With bare and bloody arms, holding large knives in their hands, laughing and quarreling, they cut the pelvis apart, having received permission from the physician to prepare the corpse for him.

References

Notes

Books

External links
  (in German, Gothic print) Ignaz Semmelweis' Open Letter to all professors of obstetrics (1862) presents statistics from other European maternity institutions.

Puerperal fever
Puerperal fever
Maternal death